The Athens Trophy is a defunct WTA Tour affiliated tennis tournament held annually in Athens in Greece from 1986 to 1990, played on outdoor clay courts at Athens Lawn Tennis Club. In 1990 the tournament was classed as a  Tier V event. In 2008 the tournament was renewed under the new name of the Vogue Athens Open, an ITF $100,000 tournament.

Finals

Singles

Doubles

See also
 ATP Athens Open – men's tournament

References
 WTA Results Archive

 
Clay court tennis tournaments
Defunct tennis tournaments in Greece
Tennis tournaments in Greece
Trophy
WTA Tour